The SafeHouse Restaurant was established in 1966 in Milwaukee, Wisconsin. Filled wall-to-wall with spy memorabilia collected by the founder/owner, David J. Baldwin. It has been used as a backdrop in movies shot in Milwaukee such as Major League, and has been featured on the History Channel as one of the best secret locations to visit in the United States. The restaurant has been in featured articles in Time, the Chicago Tribune, People Magazine, and the London daily express for its food, spy-themed drinks and espionage theme. Its mascot is Yugyps (Spyguy spelled backward). 

According to Rachael Ray in her $40 a Day series, "You would have to be a CIA agent to figure this place out in one trip." Wired Magazine says that SafeHouse is "The Hippest Place on the Planet."

The Restaurant is connected to the newsroom pub, also designed by David Baldwin, where autographs of celebrities who have spoken to the Milwaukee Press Club are displayed. The ornate banquet rooms have booths with secret entrances into the SafeHouse.

On June 16, 2015, David Baldwin retired, selling the SafeHouse to the Marcus Corporation.

In 2016, it's Milwaukee was reopened after renovation.

In April 2017, Marcus Corporation opened a second location in Chicago, IL, carrying Baldwin's legacy forward.

References

External links
http://www.chicagotribune.com/travel/chi-0711milwa-late_show,0,3835666.story
http://milwaukee.decider.com/restaurants/safe-house,49872/
http://www.wired.com/magazine/2011/01/st_hiddenplaces/?pid=4536&viewall=true
https://www.safe-house.com/milwaukee-restaurant

Theme restaurants
Restaurants in Milwaukee
Culture of Milwaukee
Restaurants established in 1966
1966 establishments in Wisconsin
Military and war museums in Wisconsin
Museums in Milwaukee
Espionage in culture